Belt-Schutsloot is a village in the Dutch province of Overijssel. It is located in the municipality of Steenwijkerland, about 3 km north of Zwartsluis.

The village originally consisted of two parts, Belt (also called "Zandbelt") and Schutsloot, and was also called "Schutsloot en Zandbelt".

Overview 
It was first mentioned in 1748 as "Sandbeld en Schutsloot". Belt means little height, and Schutsloot means "ditch with sluice". It started as two villages along a canal which merged into a single settlement. In 1840, Zandbelt was home to 130 people and Schutsloot 208 people.

Up to 1959, Belt-Schutsloot could not be accessed by road. The village is similar to nearby Giethoorn, however it has not fallen pray to mass tourism.

Gallery

References

Populated places in Overijssel
Steenwijkerland